Jayanta and Manik are the fictional detective characters created by Bengali novelist Hemendra Kumar Roy. Roy wrote a number of stories of Jayanta-Manik which are considered as one of the most popular children's literature in Bengal.

Character
Jayanta and his friend cum assistant Manik alias Maniklal are amateur detectives who live in Kolkata. They solve mysteries privately and help the police track down real culprits. Both are patriotic, courageous and intelligent. Police inspector Sundar Babu very often takes help of the detective duo. Sundar Babu is a bit comical and a foodie. Jayanta follows the latest science techniques like hypnotism, fingerprint theory to solve the cases. Jayanta likes playing the flute and taking snuff in his offtime.

Stories
 Manush Pisach
 Shani Mongoler Rahasya
 Sonar Anaras
 Nabajuger Mahadanob
 Moron Khelar Kheloar
 Nrimunda Shikari
 Sajahaner Mayur
 Mrityu Mollar
 Jayanter Kirti
 Chatrapatir Chora
 Ratanpurer Jatri
 Firoza Mukut Rahasya
 Kapaliker Kobole
 Bojrovoirober Mantra
 Pravat Roktomakha
 Venus Chorar Rahasya
 Anubiser Avishap
 Hatya Ebong Tarpor
Hatya Hahakare
 Hatyakari Hatyakahini
 Jogotsether Rotnokuthi
 Padmarag Buddha
 Nitanto Halka Mamla
 Ek Khana Ulte Pora Chair
 Amar Goendagiri
 Netajir Choy Murti
 Kacher Coffin
 Ekratti Mati
 Ekpati Juto 
 Khanikta Tamar Taar 
 Aloukik 
 Jayanter Adventure

References

Fictional amateur detectives
Fictional Bengali people
Fictional Indian people
Characters in children's literature
Bengali-language literature
Culture of Kolkata